Dailey & Vincent is an American bluegrass music group composed of Jamie Dailey (guitar, bass, vocals), Darrin Vincent (mandolin, guitar, bass, vocals), Aaron McCune (guitar, bass vocals), Wesley Smith (vocals), Patrick McAvinue (fiddle), Shaun Richardson (guitar, vocals), Bob Mummert (drums), Gaven Largent (banjo), and Blaine Johnson (piano).

The group has released nine albums since 2007, seven of these for Rounder Records, with all the albums having charted on at least one Billboard albums chart. They have also won thirteen awards from the International Bluegrass Music Association and twenty-three awards from SPBGMA (The Society for the Preservation of Bluegrass Music of America) . In 2011, they received a Grammy Award nomination for Best Country Performance by a Duo or Group with Vocal, and won the 2011 Dove Award for Best Bluegrass Album with "Singing From The Heart" In 2013, Dailey & Vincent received their second Grammy Award nomination for Best Bluegrass Album for their album "The Gospel Side Of Dailey & Vincent".

Background
Jamie Dailey was formerly the lead vocalist and guitarist for Doyle Lawson & Quicksilver from 1999-2008. Darrin Vincent was formerly a musician with Ricky Skaggs' band Kentucky Thunder, and was also part of the famous bluegrass family group The Sally Mountain Show, with his sister Rhonda Vincent of Rhonda Vincent & The Rage. The group's former banjo player, Joe Dean, left in March 2012 to pursue other musical interests and would later join Doyle Lawson & Quicksilver. Former fiddle player Jesse Stockman left the band in early August 2011 due to a wrist injury, giving way to BJ Cherryholmes who would continue that role until September of 2016. Cherryholmes joined the Christian rock singer David Crowder and a month later Dailey & Vincent announced that Patrick McAvinue would be the band's new fiddle player. In April 2018, it was announced that Jessie Baker would be leaving the band due to debilitating nerve injury in his hands. In May, Daily & Vincent announced that Gaven Largent would be the band's new banjo player. Jeff Parker left in 2019 and started his own group Jeff Parker and Company.

Discography

Albums

APhysical CD available exclusively at Cracker Barrel Old Country Store.

Music videos

Awards

References

External links

American bluegrass music groups
Musical groups from Nashville, Tennessee
Rounder Records artists